The Toyo River is a river in Aichi Prefecture, Japan. It flows into the Pacific Ocean.

See also
Toyokawa Bridge

References

Rivers of Aichi Prefecture
Rivers of Japan